Duplass Brothers Productions is an American independent film and television production company founded by Mark Duplass and Jay Duplass, two brothers who are also actors, directors, producers and writers. They have produced films such as The Puffy Chair (2005), Safety Not Guaranteed (2012), The One I Love (2014) and The Skeleton Twins (2014), and the HBO comedy-drama television series Togetherness (2015–2016) and Room 104 (2017-2020).

History
Duplass Brothers Productions was founded in 1996, with the release of the first film by brothers Jay Duplass and Mark Duplass. The company originally produced low-budget mumblecore films, but has since expanded to studio projects. In 2015, the Duplass Brothers expanded into television with their first series Togetherness, in which Mark also stars. In January 2015, Duplass Brothers Productions closed a four-picture deal with Netflix, involving financing from the company and, after a short theatrical run, the films being available to Netflix subscribers. In June 2015, Duplass Brothers Productions finalized a seven-picture distribution deal with The Orchard, releasing the Duplass-produced films theatrically prior to their Netflix release. Under the TV production arm Duplass Brothers Television, they signed a two-year overall deal with HBO in June 2015. In August 2016, Duplass Brothers announced another television project, Room 104, to air on HBO in 2017, which was quickly renewed for a second season. In 2018, it was announced the company had entered into a new four-picture deal with Netflix, which gave the streaming giant worldwide rights. Mel Eslyn was named president of Duplass Brothers Productions in 2017.

Filmography

Film

 Connect 5 (1996)
 The Puffy Chair (2006)
 Baghead (2008)
 Cyrus (2010)
 Jeff, Who Lives at Home (2011)
 Safety Not Guaranteed (2012)
 The Do-Deca-Pentathlon (2012)
 Bad Milo! (2013)
 The One I Love (2014)
 The Skeleton Twins (2014)
 Adult Beginners (2014)
 The Overnight (2015)
 Creep (2015)
 Tangerine (2015)
 6 Years (2015)
 Manson Family Vacation (2015)
 The Bronze (2016)
 Blue Jay (2016)
 Rainbow Time (2016)
 Take Me (2017)
 Outside In (2017)
 Duck Butter (2018)
 Unlovable (2018)
 Paddleton (2019)
 Horse Girl (2020)
 Language Lessons (2021)
 7 Days (2021)
 As of Yet (2021)
 Spin Me Round (2022)

Shorts
 This Is John (2003)
 Scrapple (2004)
 The Intervention (2005)

Television
 Togetherness (2015–16 for HBO)
 Animals. (2016–18 for HBO)
 Room 104 (2017–20 for HBO)
 Cinema Toast (2021– for Showtime)
 Somebody Somewhere (2021- for HBO)

Documentaries
 Asperger's Are Us (2016)
 Wild Wild Country (2018)
 Evil Genius: The True Story of America's Most Diabolical Bank Heist (2018)
 On Tour with Asperger's Are Us (2019 for HBO)
 The Lady and the Dale (2021 for HBO)
 Not Going Quietly (2021)
 Sasquatch (2021 for Hulu)

References

External links

 "How an Unlikely Hollywood Juggernaut Came to Rule Netflix" on WIRED Magazine

Film production companies of the United States
Entertainment companies based in California
Companies based in Los Angeles
Entertainment companies established in 1996
Sibling filmmakers